Te Whare Waiutuutu Kate Sheppard House is a historic home in Clyde Road in the Christchurch suburb of Ilam, bordering the University of Canterbury. For 14 years, it was the home of the leader of New Zealand's women's suffrage campaign, Kate Sheppard, during her active period. It was later the family home of the 30th Mayor of Christchurch, John Joseph Dougall. It is registered as a Category I heritage place by the New Zealand Historic Places Trust for its outstanding historical significance in relation to Sheppard. It came into government ownership during 2019.

History

The land for the house was purchased for £400 in November 1887 by Walter Sheppard, since 1871 the husband of Kate Sheppard. The land,  in size, had previously been part of the Deans estate. It was neighbouring the house of her younger sister Isabella, whose husband had bought their land in 1884, and not far from her elder sister Marie's house, who lived on Riccarton Road. Some  from the city centre, at the time the area was rural. The Sheppards moved into their villa in 1888.

After Kate Sheppard became the leader of the women's suffrage campaign, many important and influential people were frequent visitors. Strong supporters of Sheppard were the MPs John Hall and Alfred Saunders. Rev Leonard Isitt and Tommy Taylor would later gain prominence.

Walter Sheppard went into retirement in 1902 and decided to return to England. The house sold on 3 April 1902 to John Joseph Dougall, a prominent barrister and solicitor. Dougall's family consisted of a wife and four children. Upon his death on 5 September 1934, the house passed to his son Leslie, who also worked in the legal profession.

Leslie Dougall sold the house in 1939 to Helen Nicoll, the wife of the merchant Henry Nicoll. In 1944, the land was subdivided and the property reduced to its current size. Subsequent owners were Reginald Warren (July 1947 – 1954), William George Weigel (1954 – January 1956), and Dr Anthony Allison (January 1956 – December 1985), who lived in the house and operated a medical surgery from it. Andrew Everist and his wife Julia became owners in December 1985. Since separating, Julia Burbury lives there by herself.

When Andrew and Julia Everist bought the property in 1985 the historical significance was not known to them. They only found out about it in 1993 when the centenary of women's suffrage caused increased interest in Sheppard. Burbury put the house on the market just prior to the 125th anniversary of women's suffrage and on 18 September 2018, Jacinda Ardern announced that the Government is interested in buying the house to preserve its history. On 19 September 2019, it was announced that the house has been purchased by the New Zealand Government, and will be managed by Heritage New Zealand.

Heritage registration
The building was registered as a heritage building by the New Zealand Historic Places Trust on 10 December 2010 with registration number 3659 classified as Category I listing. It was registered for its outstanding historical significance in relation to Sheppard, as much of the women's suffrage campaign was orchestrated from the house.

See also

 List of historic places in Christchurch

References

External links

Official website

Heritage New Zealand Category 1 historic places in Canterbury, New Zealand
Houses completed in 1888
Buildings and structures in Christchurch
Women's suffrage in New Zealand
1880s architecture in New Zealand